Ballinderry is a village and a townland in the historical Barony of Ormond Lower, County Tipperary, Ireland. It is located between Terryglass and Nenagh where the R493 road crosses the Ballyfinboy River.

Buildings of note
Several local structures are listed as being of architectural interest.
 A four arch bridge with low arches carries the R493 road over the Ballyfinboy River.
 Ballinderry Mill, a rubble stone mill building in ruins with mill wheel in location is listed as a protected structure (RPS Ref S296) by Tipperary County Council. The Mill Lodge, a three bay, single storey over basement lodge is also listed (RPS Ref S301).
 On the roadside just south of the bridge stands an early 20th-century house which has rusticated stucco work, a strip of ceramic tiles and decorative eaves (RPS Ref S298).
 Ballinderry House, a three bay, two storey residence (RPS Ref S299).
 Elsie Hogan's, a two-storey roadside public house (RPS Ref S300) . Now home to Dé Róiste's Award winning smokehouse and restaurant.

Sport
The Shannon Rovers are the local Gaelic Athletic club. Ballinderry is on one of the North Tipperary Cycle Routes which starts at Banba Square, Nenagh.

References

Towns and villages in County Tipperary